The Vlah Church is a Serbian Orthodox church built in 1450 in the village of Donji Kraj (on Cetinje field), Zeta, Serbian Despotate (modern day Montenegro).

Stećci 
The church was built around 1450 on the site of Bogumils' necropolis, which had around 150 stećci (monumental, ornate tombstones). Only two of them are preserved today. Originally they faced each other, and were recently reoriented to be side by side. According to some legends, recorded for the first time by Ljubomir Nenadović, the 17th-century military commander Bajo Pivljanin and his wife are buried beneath them. According to another legend and documentary evidence the stećci mark the graves of the founders of the church—Ivan Borojević, born in Stari Vlah, and his wife Jelica.

Origin of the name 

This church received its name for the Vlahs who guarded the cattle of Ivan Crnojević and built the church around 1450.

There are several additional theories about the origin of the term Vlah in the name of the church. Some authors believe that the term Vlahs in the name of this church is used as an exonym. Other theories connect the name of the church to the fact that the terms such as "Vlach's church" or "Vlach's rituals" were indicators of belonging to Eastern Orthodox Church and Orthodoxy or to demonym Vlahs (according to them this church was allegedly built by settlers from Stari Vlah in modern Serbia).

Building materials 

The church was initially made of "plot", i.e. of sticks, switches and mud. It was rebuilt three times. First as "suvomeđa", which means of stones without mortar; then of "klačena", which is stones with lime mortar; and finally, in 1864 the church received its current form. A guard rail around the church was built in 1897 using barrels of Ottoman rifles captured in 1858 during the Battle of Grahovac.

Notes

References 

Religious buildings and structures completed in 1450
15th-century Serbian Orthodox church buildings
Serbian Orthodox church buildings in Montenegro
1450 establishments
Cetinje